Polemon ater, also known commonly as the black snake-eater, is a species of rear-fanged venomous snake in the subfamily Aparallactinae of the family Atractaspididae. The species is native to central Africa.

Geographic range
Polemon ater is known with certainty from the southeastern portion of the Democratic Republic of the Congo (formerly called Zaire), but is likely also found in adjacent Tanzania and Zambia based on literary records.

Taxonomy
P. ater was grouped under P. christyi until genetic analyses indicated that it was a distinct species. It is the first species in the genus Polemon to be described in over 70 years.

Diet
Polemon ater preys exclusively upon snakes (ophiophagy), including those three-quarters it size.

Reproduction
The mode of reproduction of P. ater is unknown.

References

Atractaspididae
Snakes of Africa
Reptiles of the Democratic Republic of the Congo
Endemic fauna of the Democratic Republic of the Congo
Reptiles described in 2019
Taxa named by Colin R. Tilbury